Justin Morgan Had a Horse is an American children's historical novel by Marguerite Henry, illustrated by Wesley Dennis and published by Wilcox & Follett of Chicago in 1945. It concerns the real figures of Justin Morgan and his bay stallion Figure, who lived in Vermont in the late eighteenth century. It was a runner-up for the Newbery Medal in 1946.

An edition was published by Rand McNally in 1954 with new copyrights by both Henry and Dennis. The Library of Congress catalog records report 89 pp. and 169 pp.

Plot summary

The schoolmaster, Justin Morgan, takes two colts as payment for an old debt. The younger of the two grows into a sturdy, though small, riding horse which served as the foundation of the Morgan breed.

Adaptations
In 1972, the book was adapted as a film by Disney Studios. It starred Don Murray as Justin Morgan. John Smith, formerly of the NBC series Laramie, played the part of Mr. Ames.

References

External links

1945 American novels
American children's novels
Children's historical novels
Newbery Honor-winning works
Novels set in Vermont
Novels set in the 18th century
Novels by Marguerite Henry
Children's novels about animals
American novels adapted into films
1945 children's books
Novels about horses
1972 films
1970s children's films
Films about horses
Walt Disney Pictures films
Films set in the 18th century
Films set in Vermont